It's Alec Templeton Time was an early American television program broadcast on the now-defunct DuMont Television Network. The series ran during the summer of 1955. It was a musical program hosted by blind satirist and musician Alec Templeton. The program, produced and distributed by DuMont, aired on Friday nights on most DuMont affiliates.

It's Alec Templeton Time has the distinction of being one of the last programs to air on the dying DuMont Television Network, along with Have a Heart (ended June 14, 1955), What's the Story (ended September 23, 1955) and Boxing from St. Nicholas Arena (ended August 6, 1956). The struggling network was already beginning to shut down network operations before It's Alec Templeton Time even aired its first episode, and Paramount Pictures would take control of DuMont during the summer; as a result, the series' run was brief, and did not last past the summer months.

Episode status
As is the case with most DuMont programs, nothing remains of the series today.

See also
List of programs broadcast by the DuMont Television Network
List of surviving DuMont Television Network broadcasts

References

Bibliography
David Weinstein, The Forgotten Network: DuMont and the Birth of American Television (Philadelphia: Temple University Press, 2004) 
Alex McNeil, Total Television, Fourth edition (New York: Penguin Books, 1980) 
Tim Brooks and Earle Marsh, The Complete Directory to Prime Time Network TV Shows, Third edition (New York: Ballantine Books, 1964)

External links

DuMont historical website
DuMont Television Network original programming
1955 American television series debuts
1955 American television series endings
1950s American television series
Black-and-white American television shows
Lost television shows